Twin Oaks Farm is a historic home and farm located in Bedford County, Virginia. It was built about 1850, and is a rambling two-story frame and log farmhouse with Gothic Revival style decorative detailing. It features a frame wraparound porch on the south and west elevations.  Also on the property are a contributing dingle dwelling (1930s), spring house (1850s), tenant house (1916), Apple Barn (1916), and chicken coop (1920s).  The farm supported cannery production from 1909 to 1937.

It was listed on the National Register of Historic Places in 2001.

References

Houses on the National Register of Historic Places in Virginia
Farms on the National Register of Historic Places in Virginia
Carpenter Gothic houses in Virginia
Houses completed in 1850
Houses in Bedford County, Virginia
National Register of Historic Places in Bedford County, Virginia
1850 establishments in Virginia